Timeline of longest spaceflights is a chronology of the longest spaceflights. Many of the first flights set records measured in hours and days, the space station missions of the 1970s and 1980s pushed this to weeks and months, and by the 1990s the record was pushed to over a year and has remained there into the 21st century.

A modern long-duration mission was the ISS year long mission (2015–2016) aboard the International Space Station. The most significant issue in such missions is the effects of spaceflight on the human body, due to such factors as zero-g and elevated radiation.

Record setting single-mission human stays

References

See also
 List of spaceflight records
 Manned Venus flyby
 Skylab 4

Human spaceflight
Spaceflight timelines
Spaceflights